Doto galapagoensis is a species of sea slug, a nudibranch, a marine gastropod mollusc in the family Dotidae.

Distribution
This species was first described from Floreana, Galapagos Islands.

Description
This nudibranch is translucent white mottled with black or ash-grey spots on the surface. The cerata are transparent with cream or white digestive gland inside. The terminal tubercle has an internal black spherical spot. The only animal known was probably a juvenile, only 3 mm in length when alive and moving. There were 5 pairs of cerata, but only the first two were developed with surface tubercles.

EcologyDoto galapagoensis'' was found associated with small hydroids.

References

Dotidae
Gastropods described in 2010